The White Volta or Nakambé is the headstream of the Volta River, Ghana's main waterway. The White Volta emerges in northern Burkina Faso, flows through North Ghana and empties into Lake Volta in Ghana. The White Volta's main tributaries are the Black Volta and the Red Volta.

Impact
The White Volta is a major source of drinking water for many communities along its banks and others. lt also causes seasonal flooding for many of the communities along its banks.

References

Volta River
Rivers of Ghana
Rivers of Burkina Faso
Lake Volta
International rivers of Africa

de:Volta (Fluss)#Weißer Volta